Stanisław Henryk Krzyżanowski (29 October 1874 – 10 February 1917) was a Polish physician. Alternate birth (1877) and death dates (Nov. 10, 1917) are given on the Otwock-History blog. He was among the earliest members of the Polish Socialist Party (PSP).

Krzyżanowski, was a doctor, who mostly treated poor Jewish people. During an outbreak of typhus in 1917 among his Jewish patients, Krzyżanowski eventually contracted the disease and subsequently died from its complications. His wife's name was Janina.

Krzyżanowski's life and politics had a profound impact on his daughter Irena Sendler. At great personal risk, she was instrumental in rescuing over 2,500 Jewish babies and children from the Warsaw Ghetto in 1942 during the German occupation of Poland.

References 

1917 deaths
19th-century Polish physicians
Polish Roman Catholics
People from Otwock
1874 births
20th-century Polish physicians
Deaths from typhus